Moysés Cardoso (born 2 October 1900, date of death unknown) was a Portuguese sports shooter. He competed at the 1936 Summer Olympics and 1948 Summer Olympics.

References

1900 births
Year of death missing
Portuguese male sport shooters
Olympic shooters of Portugal
Shooters at the 1936 Summer Olympics
Shooters at the 1948 Summer Olympics
Place of birth missing